The 1973 Australian Manufacturers' Championship was a CAMS sanctioned motor racing title for automobile manufacturers. It was the third Australian Manufacturers' Championship and the first to be contested with Group C Touring Cars.

Class Structure
Cars competed in four engine capacity classes:
 Up to 1300 cc
 1301 to 2000 cc
 2001 to 3000 cc
 Over 3000 cc

Points system
Championship points were awarded on a 9-8-7-6-5-4-3-2-1 basis for the first nine positions in each class plus 4-3-2-1 for the first four outright positions for all rounds except the Bathurst round. For the Bathurst round only, championship points were awarded on an 18-16-14-12-10-8-6-4-2 basis for the first nine positions in each class plus 4-3-2-1 for the first four outright positions. Only the best placed car from each manufacturer in each class at each round was eligible to score points.

Results

References

Australian Manufacturers' Championship
Manufacturers' Championship